Hugo Pool (also known as Pool Girl in the UK) is a 1997 American comedy drama film, directed by Robert Downey Sr., starring Alyssa Milano and Patrick Dempsey.

Plot
Hugo Dugay runs a small company, Hugo Pool, that cleans swimming pools in Los Angeles.  The film covers one day in her life, during which she must clean many pools in the midst of a drought that interferes with her usual water supply. In addition to dealing with several eccentric customers, including mobster Chick Chicalini and filmmaker Franz Mazur, Hugo must care for her needy parents Minerva and Henry.  Also, Hugo may be falling in love with Floyd Gaylen, a customer of hers who has ALS.

Cast
 Alyssa Milano as Hugo Dugay
 Patrick Dempsey as Floyd Gaylen
 Cathy Moriarty as Minerva Dugay
 Robert Downey Jr. as Franz Mazur
 Richard Lewis as Chick Chicalini
 Malcolm McDowell as Henry Dugay
 Sean Penn as Man With Blue Shoes
 Paul Herman as The Rabbi

Production
The film was written by Robert Downey Sr. and his wife Laura, who died of ALS. During the shooting of the film, Robert Downey Jr. was in the midst of a serious drug addiction. He was described as "thin, pale and sickly" and would deliver his lines in bursts of manic energy.

Reception
In a review for The Village Voice, Elizabeth Weitzman criticized many of the performances, with the exceptions of Dempsey, for giving an understated performance, Downey Jr., "whose talents cannot be destroyed no matter what horrors he puts them through," and Milano, "whose natural performance appears to have been cut and pasted from another (better) movie," though she "can't turn around without the camera lewdly ogling her." A Variety review states, "the movie seldom achieves the quirky, zany rhythm it strives for"; Hugo Pool is "a comedy that should have been messier and more outrageous." Like The Village Voice, Variety praises the performances of Dempsey, Milano and Downey Jr. above other cast members. The review notes the film's visual accomplishments and production, stating, "Production values are first-rate, including Joe Montgomery's radiant lensing, Lauren Gabor's colorful production design, Danilo Perez's vibrant music and Joe D'Augustine's crisp editing.

A January 1998 San Francisco Chronicle article included it on a list of the best films of 1997, which was based on the ratings of 40 major critics.

In a 2014 interview, Downey Sr. stated that Hugo Pool is "one of my films that I’m not so happy with."

References

External links

1997 films
1997 independent films
American romantic comedy films
Films directed by Robert Downey Sr.
Films with screenplays by Robert Downey Sr.
Films set in Los Angeles
Films about disability
1990s English-language films
1990s American films